Egil Andreas Olli (born 13 October 1949) is a Norwegian politician for the Labour Party. In September 2007, he became President of the Sami Parliament of Norway when he replaced Aili Keskitalo after she stepped down upon the collapse of the coalition she was heading. He was the fourth President of the Sami Parliament, and the first not to represent the Norwegian Sami Association. In early 2012 Olli announced that he would not run for reelection.

References

1949 births
Living people
Members of the Sámi Parliament of Norway
Labour Party (Norway) politicians
Norwegian Sámi politicians
People from Porsanger